Gazeran (also Romanized as Gāzerān, Gāzorān, and Gāzrān) is a village in Khondab Rural District, in the Central District of Khondab County, Markazi Province, Iran. At the 2006 census, its population was 1,507, in 425 families.

References 

Populated places in Khondab County